Emanuel Briffa (born 13 February 1994) is a Maltese former footballer who played as a defender or midfielder and made one appearance for the Malta national team.

Career
Briffa earned his first and only cap for Malta on 11 November 2015 in a friendly against Jordan. The match, which was played in Istanbul, finished as a 0–2 loss.

In 2016, Briffa was charged in a Maltese court for match-fixing. However, he was acquitted as charges were filed prior to the expiration of a three-month window which is allotted for players to report irregularities to the relevant authorities. However, he was suspended by the Malta Football Association pending an investigation by UEFA. Briffa received a lifelong ban from UEFA on 9 January 2018 for match-fixing offences during the 2017 UEFA European Under-21 Championship qualification tournament (against Montenegro on 23 March 2016 and the Czech Republic on 29 March 2016). Five other Malta under-21 national team players were also disciplined. However, Briffa protested his innocence following the decision.

Career statistics

International

References

External links
 
 
 

1994 births
Living people
Maltese footballers
Malta under-21 international footballers
Malta international footballers
Association football defenders
Association football midfielders
Floriana F.C. players
Maltese Premier League players